Adéodat is a given name.

People with the given name
Adéodat Boissard (1870–1938), French politician
Adéodat Compère-Morel (1872–1941), French politician
Joseph-Adéodat Blanchette (1893–1968), Canadian politician